The  is a Shinto Shrine located in Kyoto, Japan. It honors the heroes of Japan, especially from the period of the Bakumatsu period and the Meiji Restoration, most famously Sakamoto Ryōma and his associate Nakaoka Shintarō, who are buried side by side in the shrine. Within the shrine is a monument in memory of the Bengali jurist Radhabinod Pal.

The Ryozen Museum of History is next to this shrine.

History
In 1862, a funeral was held by volunteers at the Shinto burial site Reimeisha in the red seal land (朱印地) of the Shohoji (正法寺) temple of the :de:Ji-shu Ryozan school. There were 3 festival gods Kukurihime, Hayatama-no-Okami, and Susano Otomo.

On June 29, 1868, in order to worship the spirits of the Shishi (tenchu-gumi in order to enshrine a holy spirit etc) who fell from Emperor Meiji on the verge of the Meiji Restoration, a sacred area of a sacred mountain in Higashiyama Ward, Kyoto, a scholarship was issued to build the structure. The shrine was founded at the summit of Kyoto's Kuge (aristocratic class) and the feudal lords of Yamaguchi, Kochi, Fukui, Tottori, and Kumamoto. It has an older history than Yasukuni Shrine.

The original name of the company was called Ryozen Kansai Shokyoshasha, and the company name was especially "Kansaisha" which was repaired at national expense. In 1936 (Showa 11), there was a movement to carefully enshrine the national martyrs from Kyoto Prefecture who perished after the China Incident (支那事変) in the (Second Sino-Japanese War). The precincts were expanded and a new shrine was built.

On April 1, 1939 (Showa 14), the name of the company was changed to the current name of Kyoto Ryozen Gokoku Shrine by the Declaration of the Ministry of Home Affairs (内務大臣). After World War II, it was placed under the umbrella of a religious corporation and Association of Shinto Shrines, and left the state. During the GHQ occupation, it was renamed to Kyoto Shrine, but after Japanese independence it was restored to its original name. In 1970 (Showa 45), the Ryozen Museum of History was opened in the precincts to display materials related to the Meiji Restoration. In 2002, the comprehensive relationship with the Association of Shinto Shrines was dissolved.

Ryoma Sakamoto, who was assassinated in Kyoto, is also included in the deity, and a statue was built in the precincts. On November 15, in memory of Ryoma's virtues and comforting spirits The Ryoma Festival was held.

In addition to Ryoma, Kido Takayoshi, Shintaro Nakaoka, Rai Mikisaburo, Umeda Unpin, Torataro Yoshimura, Kuniomi Hirano, Kusaka Genzui, Takasugi Shinsaku, Ikutaro Tokoro, Miyabe Teizo, Shunzaburo Taoka (田岡俊三郎) and others, 1,356 pillars of the late Edo period. A total of about 73,000 pillars are worshiped as religious gods, including those who died during the First Sino-Japanese War, the Russo-Japanese War, and the World War II. Also, in April 2012, a statue of a kamikaze pilot was erected.

Festivals
Saitan Festival (new years festival) - January 1,～ three days
Kigensetsu Festival (Emperor Jimmu's ascension to the throne) - February 11
Spring Festival- April 28
Oharae (大祓) (purification festival)
Spirit Festival - August 13,～16th
Autumn Festival- October 14
Ryoma Festival- November 15
Tencho Festival (The Emperor's Birthday) - December 23

Showa Forest
 
In 1997 ( Heisei 9), "Showa no Mori" was established to commemorate the Great East Asian War (Pacific War). To commemorate the 50th anniversary of India's independence, there is a monument dedicated to India's representative judge, Radhabinod Pal, whose dissenting opinion at the International Military Tribunal for the Far East was that the accused were not guilty of war crimes.

Transportation
Take the Kyoto City Bus 80, 202, 206, 207 "Higashiyama Yasui" bus stop and walk 10 minutes.
15 minutes walk from Gion-Shijō Station on the Keihan Main Line.

See also
 List of Shinto shrines in Japan

Notes

External links

Shinto shrines in Kyoto
Gokoku shrines
Culture articles needing translation from Japanese Wikipedia
Beppyo shrines